China, officially the People's Republic of China (PRC), conducted a state-sanctioned doping programme on athletes in the 1980s and 1990s. The majority of revelations of Chinese doping have focused on swimmers and track and field athletes, such as Ma Junren's Ma Family Army.

More recently, three Chinese weightlifters have been stripped of their gold Olympic medals for doping at the 2008 Summer Olympics.

China's doping has been attributed to a number of factors, such as the exchange of culture and technology with foreign countries. Some commentators have compared it to the doping programme in East Germany.

Chinese swimming performances in the 1990s

In 1992 the number of Chinese swimmers in the top 25 world rankings soared from a plateau of less than 30 to 98, with all but 4 of the 98 swimmers female. Their improvement rate was much better than could have been expected as a result of normal growth and development. China subsequently performed beyond expectations to win 12 gold medals at the 1994 World Aquatics Championships amid widespread suspicions of doping. Chinese swimmers won 12 of 16 gold medals at the 1994 championships and set five world records.

Between 1990 and 1998, 28 Chinese swimmers tested positive for performance-enhancing drugs, almost half the world total of drug offenders in sport. Seven swimmers tested positive for steroids at the Asian Games in Hiroshima in late 1994, these positive tests badly affected the squad to the extent that it won only one swimming gold at the 1996 Summer Olympics in Atlanta. Following the revelations of doping among Chinese swimmers at the Hiroshima games IOC Medical Commission chairman Alexandre de Mérode discounted the possibility of officially sanctioned Chinese doping stating that the results were "accidents that could happen anywhere". Chinese leaders initially blamed racist sports officials in Japan for manufacturing test results. A report by a joint International Swimming Federation and Olympic Council of Asia delegation to Beijing in 1995 concluded that "there is no evidence that the Chinese are systematically doping athletes". The revelations led to Australian, American, Canadian and Japanese sports officials voting against Chinese participation at the 1995 Pan Pacific Swimming Championships. In 1995, the People's Daily, the official newspaper of the Central Committee of the Chinese Communist Party, published an anti-doping policy and proclaimed an official prohibition on performance-enhancing substances.

China improved in swimming until 1998 when four more positive tests and the discovery of human growth hormone (HGH) in the swimmer Yuan Yuan's luggage at the 1998 World Aquatics Championships in Perth, Australia. In the routine customs check on the swimmer's bag, enough HGH was discovered to supply the entire women's swimming team for the duration of the championships. Only Yuan Yuan was sanctioned for the incident, with speculation that this was connected to the nomination of Juan Antonio Samaranch by China for the Nobel Peace Prize in 1993. Tests in Perth found the presence of the banned diuretic masking agent triamterine in the urine of four swimmers, Wang Luna, Yi Zhang, Huijue Cai and Wei Wang. The swimmers were suspended from competition for two years, with three coaches associated with the swimmers, Zhi Cheng, Hiuqin Xu and Zhi Cheng each suspended for three months.

Zhao Jian, the deputy director-general of the China Anti-Doping Agency described the 1998 World Aquatic Championships as a "bad incident", and said that it had led to China adopting a tougher attitude towards drug testing, with drug testing removed from the main sports administration and placed in a separate agency.

The Hiroshima games also saw a hurdler, a cyclist and two canoeists test positive for the steroid dihydrotestosterone.

Ma Junren and his Ma Family Army

In February 2016, Tencent Sports reported a letter written in 1995 by Wang Junxia and nine other athletes, who claimed that women coached by Ma Junren were forced to take "large doses of illegal drugs over the years". Yuan Weimin, former Director General of the State General Administration of Sports and Chairperson of the Chinese Olympic Committee, said in his 2009 book that six athletes by former coach Ma Junren were dropped from the 2000 Summer Olympics because they were tested positive for doping.

The International Association of Athletics Federations confirmed it had reach out to the Chinese Athletics Association for verification and would investigate the matter, but the latter did not respond.

Xue Yinxian revelations

Systematic doping of Chinese athletes in Olympic Games (and other international sport events) was revealed by former Chinese doctor Xue Yinxian in 2012 and 2017. She has claimed that more than 10,000 athletes in China were doped in the systematic Chinese government doping program and they received performance-enhancing drugs in the 1980s and 1990s. She stated that the entirety of international medals (both in the Olympics and other international competitions) won by Chinese athletes in the 1980s and 1990s must be taken back. This is contrary to previous statements by the Chinese government that had denied involvement in systematic doping, claiming that athletes doped individually. The International Olympic Committee and the World Anti-Doping Agency have investigated these allegations with no conclusions or actions taken as of 2022.

Disqualified medalists

Olympic Games

Asian Games

Individual Chinese doping cases
Yang Aihua – testosterone
Wu Yanyan – anabolic steroids
Li Zhesi – erythropoietin (EPO)
Ouyang Kunpeng
Chen Xinyi – hydrochlorothiazide
Ye Qiaobo
Wang Xiuli

Reactions 
Jinxia Dong, an associate professor at Peking University, said that the doping programme was a by-product of the "open door" policy which saw the rapid expansion within China of modern cultural and technological exchanges with foreign countries. Former East German swim coaches admitted to systematic doping on their athletes; among them, coach Klaus Rudolf played a significant role in developing China's swimming programme.

Bioethicist Maxwell J. Mehlman in his 2009 book The Price of Perfection, states that "In effect China has replaced East Germany as the target of Western condemnation of state-sponsored doping". Mehlman quotes an anthropologist as saying that "When China became a 'world sports power', American journalists found it all too easy to slip China into the slot of the 'Big Red Machine' formally occupied by Eastern bloc teams".

See also
 Swimming at the 1998 World Aquatics Championships
 Doping at the Asian Games
 Sport in China
 China at the Asian Games
 China at the Olympics
 China at the Paralympics
 China at the Universiade

Notes

References

Doping by country
Drugs in sport in China
Sports scandals in China